John Quick is the name of:

John Quick (divine) (1636–1706), English nonconformist divine
John Quick (actor) (1748–1831), English actor
 Sir John Quick (politician) (1852–1932), Australian politician and author
 John H. Quick (1870–1922), sergeant in the U.S. Marine Corps during the Spanish–American War
 John Herbert Quick (1861–1925), American writer
 Johnny Quick, DC Comics characters

See also
Jonathan Quick (born 1986), ice hockey player